The Families in Mission are Catholic families coming from the Neocatechumenal Way that offer themselves voluntarily and freely, leaving their homes, work and friends to go in mission in the World according to the needs of the Catholic Church, wherever they are requested by the bishops of the Catholic Church, where evangelization, implantation of the church (implantatio ecclesiae) and/or the foundation of the Neocatechumenal Way is necessary.  

The families give their readiness to go to any part of the world, freely, trusting in Divine Providence, and receiving their destination in purpose-held meetings, called (convivences of the families), by the Responsible Team of the Neocatechumenal Way.

Their sending usually takes place in the presence of the local Bishop in an official ceremony. In most cases their assignments and mission have been ratified by the Holy Fathers, since Pope John Paul II.

The families in Mission come under the authority of the Ordinary of a Diocese in collaboration with the National Team responsible for the Neocatechumenal Way in that country. They are usually supported by diocesan missionary priests formed in the Redmptoris Mater Seminaries and Houses of Formation throughout the world. The families aim to be self sufficient, taking up paid work to pay for their living costs. Where possible, the children of these families attend the local Catholic schools. The families aim to become fully integrated into the Parish life and the culture of the city where they move to. Although the aim of the mission is to stay in their assignment for most of their life, they are not bound by religious vows and so remain free to end their mission if needed or to move to other territories if called to do so.

Where the families in mission set down roots in the parishes and dioceses where they are sent, they contribute to the New Evangelization by their fidelity to Church Teaching and Tradition. They aim to bring a fresh and renewed spirit, being open to life and passing on a renewed spirit of the Catholic family. It is often the children of these families who are at the forefront of the mission work, through their simple integration into parish and school life.

The work of missionary families is not easy. They are not immigrants. They often leave behind very successful and lucrative lives, including homes, jobs and careers. They sacrifice their securities, families, friends and familiar life for precarious lives in poorer countries. They often endure precarious situations and uncertainties. However, their fidelity to the Gospel is always attractive and is capable of bringing hope to those who need it most of all. 

Not all families are sent to what would be classed as less advantaged countries. In 2018 the Associated Press ran an article on a family from Spain serving in the United States. They were however serving in south Philadelphia which is not the most advantaged area of the city.

On December 30, 1988, during a celebration of the Holy Mass with the Neocatechumenal Way, Pope John Paul II sent 72 families on mission for the first time to the whole world, encouraging them with the words:The family is on mission. This mission is fundamental to all nations, to all mankind: it is the mission of love and life, the witness of love and life. Holy Church of God, you cannot fulfill your mission, you cannot accomplish your task in the world if not by the family and its mission! Family in mission, Trinity in mission! Since then many other families have been sent on mission. For example:

 Pope Benedict XVI sent out two hundred families in mission on 12 January 2006 
 Pope Francis sent out 250 missionary families on 16 March 2016  

There are currently thousands of families in mission around the world, in all six inhabited continents.

Notes and Documents

See also
Neocatechumenal Way
Roman Catholic Church

External links
Testimonies of families in mission.

Neocatechumenal Way